Calyptostylis is a genus of flowering plants belonging to the family Malpighiaceae.

Its native range is Madagascar.

Species:

Calyptostylis humbertii

References

Malpighiaceae
Malpighiaceae genera